Kioko may refer to:

Chokwe:
The Chokwe, a people of Central Africa
Chokwe, a language of Central Africa
Pancana, a language of Indonesia

See also
Kyoko